The BT Young Scientist and Technology Exhibition, commonly called the Young Scientist Exhibition, is an Irish annual school students' science competition that has been held in the Royal Dublin Society, Dublin, Ireland, every January since the competition was founded by Tom Burke and  Tony Scott in 1965.

The competition
The purpose of the competition is to encourage interest in science in secondary schools. For the 51st year of the competition in 2016, there were over 2,000 entries, from 396 schools which was the highest number ever, 550 of which were selected for the Exhibition at the RDS.

Students apply to participate in the competition. Their science project entries are evaluated by judges and about one-third of applicants are accepted to participate in the public exhibition. Students are allocated exhibition stands in an exhibition hall where they set up their projects for viewing by the public. Competing projects are judged during the three days of the exhibition, and prizes are awarded.

Projects are awarded in four categories: biology, physics, social and behavioural sciences, and technology. Three levels of entry are accepted. In each category three main prizes are awarded; other prizes include a display award, highly commended rosettes, and a cancer awareness award. The winners of the BT Young Scientist and Technology Exhibition advance to participate in prestigious international events such as the European Union Contest for Young Scientists.

John Monahan was the inaugural winner of the Young Scientist Exhibition in 1965; then a student of Newbridge College, his project was an explanation of the process of digestion in the human stomach. He went on to establish a NASDAQ-listed biotech company in California after attending University College Dublin.

Aer Lingus sponsored the competition for the first 33 years. 2021 marked the 21st year in which the Exhibition was sponsored by BT Ireland. It has produced at least one author, Sarah Flannery, and one billionaire, Patrick Collison. Many of the past winners have gone on to establish international companies in the technology they developed. One of the most notable was Baltimore Technologies.

Tom Burke, who co-founded the exhibition with physicist Tony Scott, died in March 2008. An award at the event (a bursary offered to senior participants) was named in his memory.

Due to the COVID-19 pandemic, the first ever virtual Young Scientist & Technology Exhibition was held in January 2021 with over 1,000 students representing more than 200 schools taking part.

Overall winners by year

Winners by age
The youngest winners are listed first.

See also
Education in the Republic of Ireland
Science Week Ireland

References

External links

Official archive
List of past winners
News article about 1999 project
News article about 1999 project
Slashdot Article on Adnan Osmani's Project

 
BT Group
1965 establishments in Ireland
Competitions in Ireland
Education in the Republic of Ireland
Recurring events established in 1965
Science competitions
Science and technology in the Republic of Ireland
Youth science
Youth in the Republic of Ireland
Science events in Ireland